Edward H. Love (May 24, 1910 – May 6, 1996) was an American animator who worked at various studios during the Golden age of American animation. He is well known for animating Walt Disney Animations' shorts Mickey's Trailer and Fantasia. Love won the Golden Award at the 1984 Motion Pictures Screen Cartoonists Awards in 1984.

Career 
Love was born on May 24, 1910, in Tremont, Pennsylvania. Love came to Los Angeles in 1930. The effects from The Great Depression caused Love to search for a job in 1931. He discovered an opening as a Disney cartoonist in the local newspaper. Love was interested, used a phone book to find an animator, and learned how to animate in the span of four months. Besides drawings as a child, his entire animation experience consisted of only those four months of learning. Love walked into Walt Disney's office, unscheduled, and showed him a stop motion animation sample of Mickey Mouse playing the violin. Walt Disney was satisfied and hired him to work at Disney as an animator that same day. Love was initially paid $18 a week and animated Goofy and Pluto more frequently than other characters. Disney gave their animators a lot of freedom by giving them the option if they want to add additional frames. Love worked with the effects manage but not with other animators. Love left the studio after participating in the Disney animators' strike in 1941. At that time, Love was making $50 a week.

Love, along with several other ex-Disney personnel, were offered jobs at the Metro-Goldwyn-Mayer Cartoon Studio. There he would work in Tex Avery's unit until 1946. At MGM, Love would animate as much as 5,600 out of the total 8,800 frames for a short film, which is about 4 out of 6 minutes of animation. He and other animators were limited to only 480 frames a week, a limitation which allowed MGM to provide openings for new animators. It also restricted the present animators from being paid more, regardless whether or not they produce more frames. After he was fired by Fred Quimby, Love would briefly work in Hugh Harman's animation studio and also help animate Bob Clampett's cartoon It's a Grand Old Nag for Republic Pictures, before settling into Walter Lantz Productions in 1947. However, the state of Lantz' studio was rapidly decreasing because Lantz did not have funds for the studio, forcing him to close it down in 1949. Love would not return following the studio's reopening.

Later career and death 
Love would move to commercial animation in the 1950s, but returned to work full-time at Hanna-Barbera Productions in 1959 for their television shows, such as Yogi Bear, The Flintstones and The Jetsons. He would also serve as an animator for DePatie–Freleng Enterprises in the 1960s and 70s. Love would continue to work in the industry up until the 1990s, where he mainly served as an animation director.

Love died on May 6, 1996, in Valencia, California at age 85.

Selected filmography

Shorts 
Mickey's Amateurs (1937)
Lonesome Ghosts (1937)
Mickey's Trailer (1938)
The Autograph Hound (1939)
Officer Duck (1939)
Billposters (1940)
The Sorcerer's Apprentice scene for Fantasia (1940)
Timber (1941)
Symphony Hour (1942)
Blitz Wolf (1942)
The Early Bird Dood It! (1942)
Dumb-Hounded (1943)
Red Hot Riding Hood (1943)
What's Buzzin' Buzzard (1943)
Screwball Squirrel (1944)
 Happy-Go-Nutty (1944)
 Big Heel-Watha (1944)
The Screwy Truant (1945)
 Jerky Turkey (1945)
The Shooting of Dan McGoo (1945)
Wild and Wolfy (1945)
Swing Shift Cinderella (1945)
Lonesome Lenny (1946)
 The Hick Chick (1946)
Northwest Hounded Police (1946)
Hound Hunters (1947)
Red Hot Rangers (1947)
 It's a Grand Old Nag (As Edward Love, 1947)
Woody the Giant Killer (1947)
Banquet Busters (1948)
Wacky-Bye Baby (1948)
Wet Blanket Policy (1948)
 Pixie Picnic (1948)
 Playful Pelican (1948)
Wild and Woody! (1948)
Scrappy Birthday (1949)
Drooler's Delight (1949)

Television shows 
The Flintstones (1960)
Yogi Bear (1961)
Scooby Doo, Where Are You? (1969)
The Smurfs (1981)
Adventures of Sonic the Hedgehog (pilot episode, 1992)

References

External links 

The Evolution of Jazz, with Ed Love, 1992-11-01, In Black America; KUT Radio, American Archive of Public Broadcasting (WGBH and the Library of Congress)

1910 births
1996 deaths
People from Schuylkill County, Pennsylvania
Animators from Pennsylvania
Hanna-Barbera people
Walter Lantz
Walt Disney Animation Studios people
Metro-Goldwyn-Mayer cartoon studio people
Walter Lantz Productions people